Chợ Rẫy Hospital is the largest general hospital in Ho Chi Minh City, Vietnam; and is also the largest national hospital in Vietnam, founded in 1900 during the French colonial rule as Hôpital Municipal de Cholon. Over the years, the hospital has also been known as Hôpital Indigène de Cochinchine (1919), Hôpital Lolung Bonnoires (1938), and Hôpital 415 (1945), until it was ultimately renamed Chợ Rẫy in 1957.

The facility was reconstructed on the area of 53,000 m² and was re-equipped to become one of the largest hospitals in Southeast Asia in June 1974 with the help of the Japanese government.

Cho Ray Hospital is a teaching hospital for the University of Medicine and Pharmacy at Ho Chi Minh City (UMP), where medical students and residents were trained under UMP faculty and Cho Ray Hospital staff.

At present, the hospital has 35 clinical, 11 subclinical and 8 functional departments. It organizes practice and postgraduate training for more than 2,500 medical students and 600 doctors each year. Chợ Rẫy Hospital has 2000 beds, employs 2,270 health workers including 500 medical doctors and pharmacists, and provides treatment for about 457,000 outpatients and 67,000 inpatients per year.

With its expertise in areas such as organ transplantation, digestive oncology, urologic oncology, nephrology and internal medicine, the hospital occupies a leading position in Vietnam. The hospital has been honoured with eight individual and collective records in the field of medicine and organ transplants in Vietnam. Especially, Cho Ray’s Department of Urology was awarded with the record of "the unit performs the most kidney transplants in Vietnam". Furthermore, Department of Urology has performed the country’s first robot-assisted living donor nephrectomy and the country’s first ABO-incompatible kidney transplantation in Vietnam.

The International Society of Nephrology has designated Cho Ray Hospital as one of three accredited regional training centers in Southeast Asia. After many years of partnership with Westmead Hospital, Royal Prince Alfred Hospital (Australia) and Asan Medical Center (South Korea), Cho Ray Hospital has become a center of excellence, developing cross-regional training programs.

See also
List of hospitals in Vietnam

References

External links
 Official page of Chợ Rẫy Hospital
 https://www.myguidevietnam.com/expats/cho-ray-hospital

Buildings and structures in Ho Chi Minh City
Hospitals in Ho Chi Minh City
Hospital buildings completed in 1974
Hospitals established in 1900
Municipal hospitals